The West Indies cricket team toured India in October 2014. The tour was originally scheduled to consist of three Test matches, five One Day International matches and one Twenty20 International match. The ODI series was reduced from five matches to four, after the third match was cancelled due to Cyclone Hudhud.

On the day of the commencement of the series, the West Indies players threatened not to come to the ground unless they were paid their due amount by the WICB. After BCCI intervention, the WICB promised to pay their players and the series started. On 17 October 2014, during the toss time, West Indies ODI captain Dwayne Bravo brought the entire team with him and announced that they are abandoning the rest of the tour because they didn't receive their promised payment from the WICB. Later the BCCI confirmed that the remaining fixtures of the tour after the 4th ODI game had been cancelled, due to an ongoing pay between the West Indies players, the West Indies Cricket Board and the players association. A senior BCCI official confirmed the development, saying the West Indies team management had informed the board of their decision earlier in the day. Sri Lanka have agreed in principle to play five ODIs in November in India following the West Indies abandoning the matches. Subsequently, the BCCI announced that it would suspend all further planned tours of the West Indies until further notice, and would undertake legal action against the WICB for the premature ending of the India tour.

In June 2016, India confirmed they would honour their tour to the West Indies, scheduled to take place the following month.

Squads

Tour matches

List A: India A vs West Indians

List A: India A vs West Indians

First class: Indian Board President's XI vs West Indians

ODI Series

1st ODI

2nd ODI

3rd ODI

4th ODI

5th ODI

T20I series

Only T20I

Test series

1st Test

2nd Test

3rd Test

References

External links 
 Series Page on Wisden
 Series Page on ESPNCricinfo

2014 in Indian cricket
2014 in West Indian cricket
Indian cricket seasons from 2000–01
2014-15
International cricket competitions in 2014–15